The 2010 Wake Forest Demon Deacons football team represented Wake Forest University during the 2010 NCAA Division I FBS football season.  The team was coached by Jim Grobe, who was coaching his tenth season at the school, and played its home games at BB&T Field.  Wake Forest competes in the Atlantic Coast Conference, as they have since the league's inception in 1953. They finished the season 3–9, 1–7 in ACC play.

Before the season

Recruiting
On National Signing Day, the Demon Deacons received letters of intent from 21 players.

Zachary Allen	LB	6–2	210	Pahokee, Fla.	Pahokee
Neil Basford	TE	6–4	240	Jacksonville, Fla.	Bishop Kenny
Daniel Blitch	OL	6–6	305	Gainesville, Ga.	North Hall
Joseph Byrd	RB	5–10	170	Cape Coral, Fla.	Ida Baker
Desmond Cooper	S	6–2	200	Jacksonville, Fla.	Bolles School
Ben Emert	RB	6–1	225	Ball Ground, Ga.	West Forsyth
Logan Feimster	LS	6–4	235	Statesville, N.C.	Statesville
Antonio Ford	DT	6–3	280	Pahokee, Fla.	Pahokee
Jonathan Garcia	TE	6–4	230	Cape Coral, Fla.	Ida Baker
Dylan Heartsill	OT	6–5	310	Prattville, Ala.	Prattville Christian
Matt James	WR	6–5	205	Raleigh, N.C.	Sanderson
Kevin Johnson	CB	6–0	160	Clarksville, Md.	River Hill
Nick Knott	RB	5–10	170	Wylie, Texas	Wylie
A.J. Marshall	CB	5–11	180	Durham, N.C.	Southern
Duke Mosby	DT	6–2	290	Washington, D.C.	Woodberry Forest
Merrill Noel	CB	5–10	180	Pahokee, Fla.	Pahokee
Tanner Price	QB	6–2	190	Austin, Texas	Westlake
Colin Summers	OG	6–4	310	Raleigh, N.C.	Needham Broughton
Brandon Terry	WR	6–5	210	Alpharetta, Ga.	Alpharetta
Patrick Thompson	LB	6–2	200	Ashburn, Va.	Stone Bridge
Daniel Vogelsang	DE	6–3	245	Versailles, Ky.	Lexington Catholic

Schedule

Roster

Coaching staff

Game summaries

Presbyterian

10th meeting. 5–4–1 all time. Last meeting 1945, 53–9 Demon Deacons in Wake Forest.

Wake Forest and Presbyterian kicked off the college football season on a Thursday night at BB&T Field.  The Deacons started out quickly with a Ted Stachitis touchdown run, as he would be the first of five Wake Forest players to score rushing touchdowns.  Alex Frye added an interception return touchdown to make it a 21–0 score after the first quarter.  Presbyterian got on the board in the second quarter on a trick play, but Josh Harris scored his first collegiate touchdown two minutes later for a 35–7 halftime lead.  The Deacs added two more rushing touchdowns in the second half, en route to over 400 yards rushing and a 53–13 win.

1st Quarter
 13:31 WFU– Ted Stachitas 34 YD Run (Jimmy Newman Kick) 7–0
 08:29 WFU– Josh Adams 14 YD Run (Jimmy Newman Kick) 14–0
 04:42 WFU– Alex Frye 44 YD Interception Return (Jimmy Newman Kick) 21–0

2nd Quarter
 03:27 WFU– Brandon Pendergrass 16 YD Run (Jimmy Newman Kick) 28–0
 03:12 PC- Michael Ruff 68 YD Pass From Derrick Overholt (Cam Miller Kick) 28–7
 01:01 WFU– Josh Harris 3 YD Run (Jimmy Newman Kick) 35–7

3rd Quarter
 11:40 PC- Anderico Bailey 18 YD Pass From Brandon Miley (Kenny Okoro Return Blocked XP for 2PT) 37–13

4th Quarter
 11:18 WFU– Devon Brown 85 YD Run (Jimmy Newman Kick) 44–13
 04:13 WFU– Jimmy Newman 36 YD FG 47–13
 01:25 WFU– Josh Harris 46 YD Run (2PT Conversion Failed) 53–13

Duke

91st meeting. 35–53–2 all time. Last meeting 2009, 45–34 Demon Deacons in Durham.  Heading into this game, Wake Forest has won 10 straight against Duke.

Wake Forest and Duke opened the 2010 ACC football season with an offensive explosion.  Each team found the end zone five times in the first half on the ground, in the air, and even on special teams.  Duke quarterback Sean Renfree threw four touchdowns, 3 in the first half.  Wake got three touchdown passes from true freshman Tanner Price, as well as one from wide receiver Marshall Williams, who threw and caught two touchdowns in the game.  After a 49-point second quarter, the teams combined for only 9 in the third, but a Price to Williams touchdown pass in the third gave Wake a lead they would not relinquish, as they beat Duke for the 11th consecutive time.

1st Quarter
 11:13 WFU– Ted Stachitas 23 YD Run (Jimmy Newman Kick) 7–0
 07:37 DUKE– Brandon "Clavinet" Connette 4 YD Run (Will Snyderwine Kick) 7–7
 03:12 DUKE- Cooper Helfet 9 YD Pass From Sean Renfree (Will Snyderwine Kick) 7–14

2nd Quarter
 14:13 WFU– Chris Givens 18 YD Fumble Return (Jimmy Newman Kick) 14–14
 08:07 WFU– Tanner Price 1 YD Run (Jimmy Newman Kick) 21–14
 07:52 DUKE- Conner Vernon 70 YD Pass From Sean Renfree (Will Snyderwine Kick) 21–21
 07:39 WFU- Chris Givens 81 YD Pass From Marshall Williams (Jimmy Newman Kick) 28–21
 05:17 WFU– Marshall Williams 13 YD Pass From Tanner Price (Jimmy Newman Kick) 35–21
 02:43 DUKE- Desmond Scott 63 YD Run (Will Snyderwine Kick) 35–28
 00:41 DUKE- Austin Kelly 13 YD Pass From Sean Renfree (Will Snyderwine Kick) 35–35

3rd Quarter
 08:12 WFU– Marshall Williams 38 YD Pass From Tanner Price (2PT Conversion Failed) 41–35
 03:13 DUKE- Will Snyderwine 46 YD FG 41–38

4th Quarter
 11:18 WFU– Danny Dembry 23 YD Pass from Tanner Price (Jimmy Newman Kick) 48–38
 08:45 DUKE- Will Snyderwine 38 YD FG 48–41
 02:53 WFU– Devon Brown 6 YD Run (2PT Conversion Failed) 54–41
 01:39 DUKE- Conner Vernon 51 YD Pass From Sean Renfree (Will Snyderwine Kick) 54–48

Stanford

2nd meeting. 1–0 all time. Last meeting 2009, 24–17 Demon Deacons in Winston-Salem.  Return game in two-game home and away series with Stanford.  Stanford traveled to Wake Forest in 2009

After a long trip out west, Wake Forest was not able to stand the Stanford offensive onslaught.  The Cardinal scored touchdowns on their first eight possessions, including all six in the first half.  Stanford quarterback Andrew Luck picked apart the Deacs with four touchdown passes, as well as a 52-yard touchdown run.  The Deacons scored three rushing touchdowns, one each from Chris Givens, Tanner Price, and Michael Campanaro.  It was Campanaro's first collegiate touchdown.

1st Quarter
 09:12 STAN- Chris Owusu 8 YD Pass from Andrew Luck (Nate Whitaker Kick) 0–7
 07:00 WFU– Chris Givens 22 YD Run (Jimmy Newman Kick) 7–7
 06:24 STAN- Chris Owusu 35 YD Pass from Andrew Luck (Nate Whitaker Kick) 7–14

2nd Quarter
 13:56 STAN- Tyler Gaffney 4 YD Run (Nate Whitaker Kick) 7–21
 11:12 STAN-  Amanam 12 YD Pass from Andrew Luck (Kick Failed) 7–27
 07:42 STAN- Andrew Luck 52 YD Run (Nate Whitaker Kick) 7–34
 02:50 STAN- Tyler Gaffney 2 YD Run (Nate Whitaker Kick) 7–41
 00:04 WFU– Jimmy Newman 48 YD FG 10–41

3rd Quarter
 12:59 STAN- Stepfan Taylor 9 YD Run (Nate Whitaker Kick) 10–48
 11:05 STAN- Doug Baldwin 3 YD Pass from Andrew Luck (Nate Whitaker Kick) 10–55
 08:46 WFU– Tanner Price 28 YD Run (Jimmy Newman Kick) 17–55
 00:20 WFU– Michael Campanaro 22 YD Run (Jimmy Newman Kick) 24–55

4th Quarter
 08:41 STAN- Alex Loukas 15 YD Run (PAT Failed) 24–61
 06:06 STAN- Andrew Stutz 2 YD Run (Nate Whitaker Kick) 24–68

Florida State

29th meeting. 5–22–1 all time. Last meeting 2009, 41–28 Seminoles in Winston-salem.

For the second consecutive week, Wake Forest was beaten by a large margin on the road.  Christian Ponder threw two touchdown passes, which was more than enough for the Seminoles defense, who shut out the Deacs and allowed only 185 yards of total offense.  Ponder added a rushing touchdown, and backup quarterback E.J. Manuel added a touchdown pass as well.  The Deacons were shut out for the first time since 2008.

1st Quarter
 No Scoring

2nd Quarter
 13:22 FSU- Willie Haulstead 10 YD Pass from Christian Ponder (Dustin Hopkins Kick) 0–7
 05:28 FSU- Dustin Hopkins 34 YD FG 0–10

3rd Quarter
 08:34 FSU- Christian Ponder 6 YD Run (Dustin Hopkins Kick) 0–17

4th Quarter
 07:28 FSU- Willie Haulstead 4 YD Pass from Christian Ponder (Dustin Hopkins Kick) 0–24
 01:04 FSU- Kenny Shaw 23 YD Pass from E.J. Manuel (Dustin Hopkins Kick) 0–31

Georgia Tech

30th meeting. 8–21 all time. Last meeting 2009, 30–27 Yellow Jackets in Atlanta.

The Deacons led 17–6 heading into the fourth quarter, but Josh Nesbitt led Georgia Tech back into the game, culminating in a nine-yard touchdown pass to Correy Earls with only fifteen seconds left.  Brandon Pendergrass and Josh Adams had touchdown runs for the Deacons, who played much of the game with reserve quarterback Skylar Jones after injuries claimed starting quarterback Ted Stachitas and backup Brendan Cross.  The loss was the Deacons third straight, and second straight close loss to Georgia Tech.

1st Quarter
 10:54 GT- Scott Blair 47 YD FG 0–3
 03:51 WFU- Jimmy Newman 20 YD FG 3–3

2nd Quarter
 01:22 WFU- Brandon Pendergrass 1 YD Run (Jimmy Newman Kick) 10–3
 00:27 GT- Scott Blair 45 YD FG 10–6

3rd Quarter
 00:42 WFU- Josh Adams 3 YD Run (Jimmy Newman Kick) 17–6

4th Quarter
 10:23 GT- Scott Blair 42 YD FG 17–9
 06:50 GT- Embry Peeples 20 YD Pass from Joshua Nesbitt (Joshua Nesbitt Run for 2PT Conversion) 17–17
 02:21 WFU- Jimmy Newman 26 YD FG 20–17
 00:15 GT- Correy Earls 9 YD Pass from Joshua Nesbitt (Scott Blair Kick) 20–24

Navy

12th meeting. 7–4 all time. Last meeting 2009, 13–10 Midshipmen in Annapolis.  This game is the last of a four-game series between the two teams.  Wake Forest won in 2007, and Navy won in 2008 and 2009.

For the second consecutive week, Wake Forest allowed a last minute touchdown which led to a loss.  Ricky Dobbs found Greg Jones on a 6-yard touchdown pass with 26 seconds to go to give Navy a 28–27 lead.  Tanner Price led the Deacons with a career-high 326 yards and 3 total touchdowns.  Chris Givens and Devon Brown had touchdown catches for the Deacs, and Jimmy Newman added two FGs.  The Deacons outgained the Midshipmen 403–368, but were unable to hold on to the win.

1st Quarter
 12:44 WFU- Tanner Price 1 YD Run (Jimmy Newman Kick) 7–0
 07:34 NAVY- Alexander Teich 6 YD Pass from Ricky Dobbs (Joe Buckley Kick) 7–7

2nd Quarter
 13:24 WFU- Jimmy Newman 45 YD FG 10–7
 10:12 NAVY- Ricky Dobbs 3 YD Run (Joe Buckley Kick) 10–14
 00:12 WFU- Chris Givens 11 YD Pass from Tanner Price (Jimmy Newman Kick) 17–14

3rd Quarter
 11:59 NAVY- Ricky Dobbs 4 YD Run (Joe Buckley Kick) 17–21
 01:08 WFU- Devon Brown 12 YD Pass from Tanner Price (Jimmy Newman Kick) 24–21

4th Quarter
 08:34 WFU- Jimmy Newman 31 YD FG 27–21
 00:26 NAVY- Greg Jones 6 YD Pass from Ricky Dobbs (Joe Buckely Kick) 27–28

Virginia Tech

35th meeting. 11–22–1 all time. Last meeting 2006, 27–6 Hokies in Winston-Salem.  This is Wake Forest's first game at Virginia Tech since the Hokies joined the ACC in 2004.

The Demon Deacons' slide continued, as they dropped their fifth straight game, this time to Virginia Tech.  The Hokies scored 49 first half points en route to a lopsided result.  The bright spot for Wake came from freshman running back Josh Harris, who ran for 241 yards and 2 touchdowns.  It was the most yards ever allowed to a player by Virginia Tech.  Tanner Price found Chris Givens for a 78-yard touchdown, but that was the bright spot in an otherwise forgettable day for the freshman quarterback.

1st Quarter
 13:29 VT- Logan Thomas 2 YD Pass from Tyrod Taylor (Chris Hazley Kick) 0–7
 07:36 VT- Darren Evans 5 YD Run (Chris Hazley Kick) 0–14
 06:17 WFU– Josh Harris 33 YD Run (Jimmy Newman Kick) 7–14
 03:02 VT- Danny Coale 25 YD Pass from Tyrod Taylor (Chris Hazley Kick) 7–21

2nd Quarter
 12:34 VT- Darren Evans 8 YD Run (Chris Hazley Kick) 7–28
 12:16 WFU– Josh Harris 87 YD Run (Jimmy Newman Kick) 14–28
 08:59 VT- Tyrod Taylor 1 YD Run (Chris Hazley Kick) 14–35
 03:36 VT- Darren Evans 1 YD Run (Chris Hazley Kick) 14–42
 00:52 VT- Jarrett Boykin 10 YD Pass from Tyrod Taylor (Chris Hazley Kick) 14–29

3rd Quarter
 11:35 WFU– Chris Givens 78 YD Pass from Tanner Price (Jimmy Newman Kick) 21–49
 04:52 VT- Chris Hazley 33 YD FG 21–52

4th Quarter
 No Scoring

Maryland

59th meeting. 16–41–1 all time. Last meeting 2009, 42–32 Demon Deacons in Winston-Salem.

Wake Forest lost another road game, this time a 62–14 decision to Maryland.  The Terps blocked two Wake punts and returned two interceptions back for touchdowns.  Josh Harris scored on a TD run for Wake, and Terrence Davis caught his first touchdown as a Demon Deacon, but it was nowhere near enough to stop the Terps, who received touchdowns from 8 different players.  Maryland outgained Wake Forest in the game 446–155.

1st Quarter
 10:04 MD- Travis Baltz 22 YD FG 0–3
 02:25 MD- Torrey Smith 17 YD Pass from Danny O'Brien (Travis Baltz Kick) 0–10
 00:02 WFU– Josh Harris 6 YD Run (Jimmy Newman Kick) 7–10

2nd Quarter
 02:25 MD- Quintin McCree 28 YD Pass from Danny O'Brien (Travis Baltz Kick) 7–17
 02:25 MD- Haroon Brown 3 YD Pass from Danny O'Brien (Travis Baltz Kick) 7–24
 01:11 MD- Travis Baltz 32 YD FG 7–27

3rd Quarter
 13:04 MD– Kenny Tate 8 YD Interception Return (Travis Baltz Kick) 7–34
 09:49 MD- LaQuan Williams 24 YD Pass from Danny O'Brien (Travis Baltz Kick) 7–41
 09:15 MD– Ryan Donohue 24 YD Interception Return (Travis Baltz Kick) 7–48
 02:56 MD– Davin Meggett 14 YD Run (Travis Baltz Kick) 7–55

4th Quarter
 14:49 WFU- Terence Davis 8 YD Pass from Tanner Price (Jimmy Newman Kick) 14–55
 07:23 MD– D.J. Adams 1 YD Run (Travis Baltz Kick) 14–62

Boston College

18th meeting. 6–9–2 all time. Last meeting 2009, 27–24 Eagles in Chestnut Hill.

Wake Forest's losing streak reached 7 with a 23–13 loss to Boston College.  Montel Harris led the way for the Eagles with 183 yards rushing and three touchdowns, and the BC defense turned over the Deacs 5 times.  The lone Wake touchdown was a Marshall Williams to Chris Givens strike on a reverse pass, the second time the two combined for a score on the season.  With the loss, the Demon Deacons have been eliminated from bowl contention for the second consecutive season.

1st Quarter
 14:28 BC– Montel Harris 26 YD Run (Nate Freese Kick) 0–7
 00:28 WFU- Jimmy Newman 37 YD FG 3–7

2nd Quarter
 11:37 BC– Montel Harris 3 YD Run (Nate Freese Kick) 3–14
 02:26 WFU- Jimmy Newman 39 YD FG 6–14

3rd Quarter
 12:04 BC– Montel Harris 1 YD Run (Kick Blocked) 6–20

4th Quarter
 09:20 WFU- Chris Givens 41 YD Pass from Marshall Williams (Jimmy Newman Kick) 13–20
 03:54 BC- Nate Freese 25 YD FG 13–23

North Carolina State

104th meeting. 36–61–6 all time. Last meeting 2009, 30–24 Demon Deacons in Winston-Salem.

NC State broke open the game with 28 unanswered points in the second half.  Russell Wilson had two touchdown passes as well as two on the ground to lead the Wolfpack to a lopsided win over the Deacons.  Wake Forest got its sole points on a Jimmy Newman field goal.  Michael Campanaro led the team in both rushing and receiving yards for the Demon Deacons.

1st Quarter
 05:42 NCST- Chris Hawthorne 25 YD FG 0–3

2nd Quarter
 12:35 WFU- Jimmy Newman 19 YD FG 3–3
 07:47 NCST– Jarvis Williams 4 YD Pass from Russell Wilson (Chris Hawthorne Kick) 3–10

3rd Quarter
 12:50 NCST– Owen Spencer 38 YD Pass from Russell Wilson (Chris Hawthorne Kick) 3–17
 06:25 NCST– Russell Wilson 2 YD Run (Chris Hawthorne Kick) 3–24

4th Quarter
 12:56 NCST– Russell Wilson 1 YD Run (Chris Hawthorne Kick) 3–31
 07:42 NCST– James Washington 1 YD Run (Chris Hawthorne Kick) 3–38

Clemson

76th meeting. 17–57–1 all time. Last meeting 2009, 38–3 Tigers in Clemson.

Wake Forest's losing streak reached 9 with a 30–10 loss to Clemson on Senior Day in Winston-Salem.  Jamie Harper had 142 yards rushing and a 63-yard touchdown.  Wake Forest could only manage 205 yards of offense against the Tigers.  The lone Wake touchdown was a Josh Harris 4th quarter touchdown run.

1st Quarter
 10:44 CLM- Chandler Catanzaro 43 YD FG 0–3

2nd Quarter
 08:06 CLM- Chandler Catanzaro 22 YD FG 0–6
 00:46 CLM- Jaron Brown 40 YD Pass from Kyle Parker (Chandler Catanzaro Kick) 0–13

3rd Quarter
 00:46 CLM- DeAndre Hopkins 2 YD Pass from Kyle Parker (Chandler Catanzaro Kick) 0–20

4th Quarter
 13:52 CLM- Chandler Catanzaro 32 YD FG 0–23
 08:38 WFU- Jimmy Newman 45 YD FG 3–23
 08:19 CLM- Jamie Harper 63 YD Run (Chandler Catanzaro Kick) 3–30
 06:02 WFU– Josh Harris 1 YD Run (Jimmy Newman Kick) 10–30

Vanderbilt

13th meeting. 5–7 all time. Last meeting 2008, 23–10 Demon Deacons in Winston-Salem.

Wake Forest ended their season snapping their nine-game losing streak with a big win in Nashville.  Josh Harris led the way with 138  yards rushing and was one of four Demon Deacons to record rushing touchdowns.  Josh Adams scored on an eleven-yard run in his last collegiate game.  Tanner Price and Chris Givens also scored for Wake Forest.  The Deacons ended their season at 3–9.

1st Quarter
 11:46 VAN- Ryan Fowler 31 YD FG 0–3
 09:07 WFU– Josh Harris 15 YD Run (Jimmy Newman Kick) 7–3
 05:12 WFU- Jimmy Newman 32 YD FG 10–3

2nd Quarter
 10:09 WFU– Josh Adams 11 YD Run (Jimmy Newman Kick) 17–3
 02:28 WFU– Tanner Price 4 YD Run (Jimmy Newman Kick) 24–3
 00:09 VAN- Ryan Fowler 31 YD FG 24–6

3rd Quarter
 05:17 WFU- Jimmy Newman 36 YD FG 27–6

4th Quarter
 14:47 WFU– Chris Givens 9 YD Run (Jimmy Newman Kick) 34–6
 12:26 VAN– Jordan Matthews 17 YD Pass from Jared Funk (Ryan Fowler Kick) 34–13

Statistics

Scores by quarter

Offense

Rushing

Passing

Receiving

Scoring

References

Wake Forest
Wake Forest Demon Deacons football seasons
Wake Forest Demon Deacons football